The Vanderbilt Avenue station was a station on the now-demolished BMT Myrtle Avenue Line and BMT Lexington Avenue Line in Brooklyn, New York City. It had two tracks and one island platform. It closed on October 4, 1969, along with the rest of the elevated structure, after a fire. The next stop to the north was Washington Avenue, and to the south was Navy Street.

References

Defunct BMT Myrtle Avenue Line stations
Former elevated and subway stations in Brooklyn
Railway stations in the United States opened in 1888
Railway stations closed in 1969
1888 establishments in New York (state)
1969 disestablishments in New York (state)